Zhe may refer to:

 Zhe (Cyrillic), a letter of the Cyrillic alphabet
 Zhe, a proposed gender-neutral pronoun (with: zhim, zhers, zhimself)
 Maclura tricuspidata (or zhè), a tree native to East Asia
 Že, a letter of the Perso-Arabic alphabet
 Zhejiang, a province of China
 Qiantang River, the river after which Zhejiang Province was named
Schools
 Zhe school (guqin), a school of musicians for the guqin
 Zhe school (painting), painters of Southern School, which thrived during Ming dynasty of China
People
 Viceroy of Min-Zhe, title of government official of China
 Su Zhe (1039-1112), a politician and essayist from Meishan, China
 Zou Zhe (1636-c.1708), noted Chinese painter during Qing Dynasty
 Jiao Zhe, a Chinese footballer
 Feng Zhe (1987- ), a male Chinese gymnast
 Chen Zhe (1993- ), a professional snooker player from Shanxi, China
 Li Zhe (disambiguation), various people
 Shi Zhe (1905-1998), a Chinese interpreter
 Song Zhe, a diplomat, ambassador of the People's Republic of China